The Vez River is a river in Portugal.

See also
 Rivers of Portugal

Rivers of Portugal
Lima River